Yvonne Green (born 8 April 1957) is an English poet, translator, writer and barrister.

Life and career
Green, who lives in Hendon and Herzliya, was born in Finchley, north London on 8 April 1957. She attended the Henrietta Barnett School and then went on to read law at the London School of Economics and Political Science. Green was called to the Bar in New York and England and first practised in New York at Milbank Tweed Hadley & McCloy and the Legal Aid Society and later in London in the Inner Temple but retired as a commercial barrister in 1999 so she could publish the poetry that she had always written. She is of Bukharan Jewish heritage.

Her first pamphlet, Boukhara, was published in 2007 and won The Poetry Business 2007 Book & Pamphlet Competition. Her first full-length collection, The Assay was published in 2010 and as a result of an award from Celia Atkin and Lord Gavron was translated into Hebrew in 2013, under the title HaNisuyi and published in Israel by Am Oved. Honoured, her most recent work has "telling detail and great emotional power"  according to Alan Brownjohn. In Honoured, Green juxtaposes the idealised vision of Israel with the Zionist narrative of the diaspora. Green was Poet-in-Residence to Spiro's Ark from 2000 to 2003, Norwood Ravenswood in 2006, Casa Shalom from 2007 to 2008, Jewish Woman's Aid from 2007 to 2009 and since 2013, to Baroness Scotland of Asthall's Global Foundation To End Domestic Violence (EDV GF).

After the November 2015 Paris attacks Green read translations from Hebrew as well as some of her own work at a Poetry and Music of the Middle East event in St Albans. On 6 June 2016 Green's poem, "The Farhud: Baghdad's Shabu'ot 1st and 2nd June 1941", was read in the Israeli Knesset to commemorate the Farhud. On 3 July 2017 Green read out Bejan Matur's poems at "The Kurdish Sisterhood" event organised by the Exiled Lit Cafe at the Poetry Café. She currently convenes two monthly groups, one at Hendon Library called "Wall of Words" and the second at JW3, Europe's largest Jewish cultural centre, called "Taking the Temperature". She also regularly gives readings and talks on translating Semyon Lipkin.

Awards and honours
2007 The Poetry Business' Book & Pamphlet Prizewinner for Boukhara
Winter 2011 Poetry Book Society Recommended Translation Award for After Semyon Izrailevich Lipkin
2012 Buxton prize Commendation for Welcome to Britain

Published works

Poetry collections
The Assay (Smith/Doorstop, 2010) 
Selected Poems and Translations (Smith/Doorstop, 2014) 
Honoured (Smith/Doorstop, 2015) 
Jam & Jerusalem (Smith/Doorstop, 2018)

Translations

From Russian
After Semyon Izrailevich Lipkin (Smith/Doorstop, 2011) 
By the Sea After Semyon Lipkin (The Penguin Book of Russian Poetry)

From Punjabi
Mangoes After Amarjit Chandan (Brittle Star) Autumn 2005

Pamphlets and limited editions
Boukhara (Smith/Doorstop Books, 2007)

Published periodicals
The Silk Routes, 9/6/20 & A Conversation With Ruth Padel (Issue 66 The North) August 2021
The Berber Women (Jewish Quarterly) Winter 2001/2
Memory of Milk, Stormy Night (The Wolf) Autumn 2002
Souriya, Basmati, Our Food (Areté) Winter 2002  and (Petits Propos Culinaires 74) December 2003
Souriya (PEN International) Volume 53, No 2, 2003 
Letter from Shushan (Jewish Renaissance) Autumn 2003 and (The Wolf) Spring 2004
There is a Boat (Poetry Review) Autumn 2003 
Shoe Shopping (Interpreter's House) October 2003
Taking The Bride to the Henna Night (Modern Poetry in Translation) Series 3 No.2 2004 and The Haaretz Poem of the Week 27 January 2015
The Prayer, Looking at the Crib (Second Light Publications 16) 2004
Basmati (Sephardi Bulletin) April 2004
The Cemetery at St. Martin (European Judaism) Spring 2004
There's A Different History (Petits Propos Culinaires 77) December 2004
My Fathers Room (London Magazine) April/May 2005
Our Food (Sameah) Spring 2005
Slowly The Air (Magma) Winter 2005
I Didn't Really Realise (Jewish Women's Aid News) November 2005
As Well As I Can (Norwood/Ravenswood's Annual Publication) November 2006
Without Your Jews (Bevis Marks Synagogue's 350th Anniversary Publication) December 2006 and (PN Review) 178 volume 34 No 2 Nov/Dec 2007
Mother Me Always (St. Nicholas Church, Idbury Publication) March 2007
She Can't Believe What Happens (Jewish Women's Aid News) August 2007
The Éboule (At Home) (Cimarron Review) Winter 2007
And For Years Later, After You're Free (Jewish Women's Aid Annual Publication) 2008
Originating Summons (The Casa Shalom Journal of the Institute for Marrano-Anusim Studies) Volume 10 2008
Advice (The Legal Studies Forum) Volume XXXII, No.1, 2008
A Lawyer's Poem (PN Review) 181, Volume 34 No. 5 May/Jun 2008
Ghetto Blaster, That I May Know You (The North) 2008 and (Statement for the Prosecution Anthology) 2005 
War Poem, Silent Blessing, How To Beat Your Wife (Cardinal Points) Volume 3 2011
That Kind of War, Truce (Peace One Day Global Truce Publication) Autumn 2012 
Joker (Miracle) February 2014
Jews (The North) Autumn 2014 
Year (Gold Dust) 2014
All Artist (Brittle Star) Issue 34 2014
Jews, Our Food, My Fathers Room (And Other Poems) January 2015
The Poetry of Propaganda (London Grip New Poetry) Spring 2015
Dumb (Jewish Quarterly) Spring 2015
The Poetry of Propaganda (Jewish Renaissance Magazine) April 2015 page 51

Translated publications
Three of her poems were published in translation in the Summer 2006 edition of Dimui (Beit Moreshet B'Yerushalayim), Out of the Ordinary, Bibi and Souriya. 

A grant from Celia Atkin and Lord Gavron enabled Green's "The Assay" to be translated into Hebrew. They were then published in Israel by Am Oved under the title HaNisuyi (הניסוי)

Writings

A conversation with Louise Glück
Louise Glück gave a rare interview to Green which was published in PN Review 196 in December 2010.

Reviews
Green has reviewed the works of other poets. She has reviewed Daniel Weissbort in the April/May 2007 edition of the London Magazine.

Gaza reporting
In 2008 Green wrote "Reflections on a Visit to Shderot" that appeared on the Freedom in a Puritan Age website. Five days after Operation Cast Lead, Green entered the Gaza Strip to see the situation for herself after hearing the media reports throughout the war. She then wrote a number of pieces from her experience. She wrote a report entitled "A Verbatim Note on a Visit to Gaza". Green also wrote an op-ed article entitled "Puzzled in Gaza" that featured in The Jerusalem Post and the Boston Globe where she stated, "What I saw was that there had been precision attacks made on all of Hamas's infrastructure…most of Gaza…was visibly intact." Green also had was also interviewed by The Jewish Chronicle and Bridges for Peace about her experiences.

Radio features
The Food Programme – BBC Radio 4 
Woman's Hour – BBC Radio 4
Poetry Please – BBC Radio 4
Bridges for Peace Interview

Readings and events
Taking The Temperature is a monthly group at JW3 that Green organises. She was in conversation there with Maureen Kendler on 10 February 2015 and on 23 March 2015 with Sean O'Brien. The group has an audience of readers and writers including Alan Brownjohn, Elaine Feinstein, Deborah Sacks and June Lausch.
Reading at the Pushkin House Russian Poetry Week
2007 Reading at StAnza
2008 Poets on Fire reading
2009 Talks on Gaza and Sderot
2009 Reading of her translation of Yehuda Amichai's notes for unfinished poems
2010 Russian Translations reading at The Troubadour
2010 Poetry at The Troubadour
2012 Reading for the Exiled Writers Ink
2012 Reading at the Buxton Poetry Competition
2014 Reading at the Jewish Museum
2016 Reading of her poem "The Farhud: Baghdad's Shabu'ot 1st and 2nd June 1941" which was commissioned by Harif to mark the 75th anniversary of The Farhud
2016 Featured poet at the Poetry Salon in The Master's House in Ledbury

See also
Volume 22 Part 1 Translation and Literature Spring 2013 (Article by Donald Rayfield)
Poetry Review (Volume 101:1 Spring 2011)
PBS Bulletin (Winter 2011) (Review of After Semyon Izrailevich Lipkin)
Frances Spurrier reviews The Assay by Yvonne Green
London Grip review of Semyon Izrailevich Lipkin
Featured poet for Holocaust Memorial Day 2015 in Haaretz by Vivian Eden (Poem of The Week)
London Grip review of Honoured

References

Further reading
Semyon Lipkin

External links 
 Yvonne Green – PN Review
 Welcome to Britain & other poems ~ Yvonne Green
 Yvonne Green – Stosvet
 Cardinal Points Journal
 Poetry Magazine
 The Augean Stables
 And Other Poems
 Poetry Please
 The Berber Women
 Her Knitting poem
 A poem for Gilad Shalit
 Cahal Dallat

1957 births
Alumni of the London School of Economics
People educated at Henrietta Barnett School
English women poets
English Jews
Living people
People from Finchley
British human rights activists
Women human rights activists
British Zionists
Bukharan Jews
Jewish poets
English poets
Jewish activists
Jewish women writers